Diarmaid Marsden is a retired Gaelic footballer who played at senior level for the Armagh county team and won an All-Ireland Senior Championship medal in 2002. He was also an All-Star. Marsden won two county titles with his club Clan na Gael and a Sigerson Cup medal with Queen's University Belfast.

Playing career
Marsden was born in Lurgan, County Armagh, and was a member at senior levelof the Armagh county team from 1993 until 2007. This was a very successful time for Armagh. He was part of the team to bring Armagh its only All-Ireland title in 2002. MHe played in the 2003 final, in which he was sent off. He also won six Ulster Senior Football Championships in 1999, 2000, 2002, 2004, 2005 and, 2006. He also won an All Star in 1999 when Armagh made it to the All Ireland semi final for the first time since 1982.

Before joining the senior team, he won an Ulster Minor Football Championship in 1992 and also played in that year’s All-Ireland Minor Football Championship final but lost out to Meath.

In 2000, he was captain of the Queen's University Belfast team that won the Sigerson Cup.

He played football with his local club Clan na Gael in Armagh with whom he won Armagh Senior Football Championships in 1993 and 1994.

References
 http://hoganstand.com/armagh/ArticleForm.aspx?ID=1709
 http://hoganstand.com/armagh/ArticleForm.aspx?ID=73723
 http://hoganstand.com/armagh/ArticleForm.aspx?ID=85135
 http://hoganstand.com/Armagh/Profile.aspx

Year of birth missing (living people)
Living people
Armagh inter-county Gaelic footballers
Clan na Gael CLG Gaelic footballers
Gaelic football forwards
People from Lurgan
Winners of one All-Ireland medal (Gaelic football)